KQHK (103.9 FM, "103.9 The Hawk") is a radio station broadcasting a classic rock music format. Licensed to McCook, Nebraska, United States, the station is currently owned by Armada Media,.

References

External links

QHK
Classic rock radio stations in the United States
Radio stations established in 1971